Osman Alp Eden (born 1958) is a Turkish mathematician, scientist and professor of mathematics. He is a retired member of the Boğaziçi University Mathematics Department in İstanbul, Turkey.

Education
Alp Eden was born in İstanbul in 1958. He finished the high school Robert College of Istanbul in 1976. He graduated from Boğaziçi University Civil Engineering and  Mathematics departments in 1981. He received his PhD  in Mathematics under the supervision of Ciprian Ilie Foiaș at the Indiana University Bloomington in the United States in 1989.

Academic career
He worked in Arizona State University between 1989-1992. Then he became  a full time member of the Department of Mathematics, at Boğaziçi University, Istanbul.   In years he served as the chair of the department and the vice-dean of the Faculty of Arts and Sciences. He retired in 2015 and moved to Izmir. He is one of the founders of  the Masters program in Financial Engineering at Boğaziçi University.  Between 2006-2016 he was a member of the Steering Committee of the Istanbul Center for Mathematical Sciences (IMBM). He served as the Chief Editor of the Turkish Journal of Mathematics. After retirement he served as the Editor of the popular mathematics journal Matematik Dünyası published by the Turkish Mathematical Society (TMD). 

He has been an active researcher, having published more than 50 scientific manuscripts with more than 600 citations. In 1995 he was awarded the Science Award for Young Scientists given by the Scientific and Technological Research Council of Turkey (TUBITAK). He was awarded the Boğaziçi University Award for Excellence in Research in 1998 (for young scientists) and again in 2009. A one-day PDE workshop was held in his honor in 2015 by TMD. There is a conjecture in the field of dynamical systems named after Alp Eden.

Visiting positions
He has held visiting positions at  the Université de Poitiers, France in 1997 and in 2000. He worked as a researcher numerous times and years  in the Feza Gürsey Institute for Basic Sciences at Boğaziçi University.

Research areas
His research interests include non-linear PDEs, dynamical systems, finance mathematics and mathematical modelling.

Representative scientific publications 
 Book: Eden, A.; Foias, C.; Nicolaenko, B.; Temam, R. Exponential attractors for dissipative evolution equations. RAM: Research in Applied Mathematics, 37. Masson, Paris; John Wiley & Sons, Ltd., Chichester, 1994.

 Eden, A.; Kalantarov, V. K. The convective Cahn-Hilliard equation. Appl. Math. Lett. 20 (2007), no. 4, 455–461.

 Eden, A.; Milani, A. J. "Exponential attractors for extensible beam equations". Nonlinearity 6 (1993), no. 3, 457–479. 	

 Eden, A.; Milani, A. J.; Nicolaenko, B. Finite-dimensional exponential attractors for semilinear wave equations with damping. J. Math. Anal. Appl. 169 (1992), no. 2, 408–419.

 Eden, A.; Michaux, B.; Rakotoson, J.-M. Doubly nonlinear parabolic-type equations as dynamical systems. J. Dynam. Differential Equations 3 (1991), no. 1, 87–131.

Memberships
Alp Eden is a member of the Turkish Mathematical Society and the American Mathematical Society.

References

External links
 

Turkish mathematicians
1958 births
Living people
Scientists from Istanbul
Indiana University Bloomington alumni